Allmänna Idrottsklubben (English: the Public Sports Club), usually referred to as just AIK, is a professional sports club from Stockholm, Sweden. Founded in 1891, at the downtown address of Biblioteksgatan 8 in the district of Norrmalm, the club is the largest in Scandinavia. The club's achievements include Swedish championship titles in a slew of sports: football, ice hockey, floorball, bandy, handball, bowling, badminton, athletics, and many other sports, as well as Wimbledon championships and French Open in tennis (through Sven Davidson, Lennart Bergelin, and Ulf Schmidt).

Founding
The idea to start an athletic association began when the brothers Isidor and Paul Behrens were taking a walk through Hantverkargatan, in central Stockholm. They were walking pretty fast; and noticed that there were two other youngsters behind them who also walked quickly. The strangers tried to walk past the Behrens, so they had to speed up to keep the lead; but the strangers did the same. Finally all of them started to run in what now looked like an improvised competition. When Isidor and Paul were far away from the unknown youngsters, Isidor said that they should start an athletic association and compete with others.

So the brothers gathered their friends, who had strong athletic interest, and held a meeting at Behrens' on February 15, 1891, on Biblioteksgatan 8, in central Stockholm. Isidor introduced his idea to everyone, and they liked it. Since the boys agreed that every thinkable sport should be practiced, they decided that “Allmänna Idrottsklubben” (The General Sports Club) would be a suitable name. The name also had other meanings: AIK allowed anybody to become a member; and at this time many athletic clubs were limited (e.g. the military).

Colours and badge

AIK's primary colours are black and yellow. White is the secondary colour.

The club's crest is dark blue, yellow and gold. The crest's style is arguably art nouveau, the predominant style at the turn of the 20th century. AIK's crest was created by Fritz Carlsson-Carling, a runner and football player. Contrary to popular belief, the sun has nothing to do with the coat of arms of Solna Municipality. Solna was not a city until 1943, i.e. six years after Råsunda Football Stadium was completed and 52 years after AIK was founded in Stockholm City Centre.

Departments

American football
American football became a part of AIK in 2020, when it took over the organization of Northside Bulls. They compete in the second tier, Swedish American Football Division 1.

Athletics
Athletics was the original sport practiced by the club in 1891. The Swedish term used for athletics at the time was allmänn idrott, which the club’s name partly is derived from. Athletics was folded in 1916. In 2012 it was reintroduced as a department of the club.

Bandy

Basketball
In 2016 AIK merged with Solna based basketball club Solna Vikings, champions of Basketligan in 2003.

Boules

Bowling

Floorball

Football

Golf
Golf was added as a department in 2004.

Handball

Ice hockey

Wrestling
AIK competed in wrestling as early as 1893. It is unknown when wrestling was folded. In 2017 several professional wrestlers from Huddinge enquired to create a wrestling department in AIK.

Defunct departments

Media
On 5 February 1995, AIK became the first non-American sports club to promote an Internet website.

Support

Fans of the club are referred to as AIK:are or gnagare (meaning rodent); both words are the same in singular and plural.

Although AIK fans can be found all over Stockholm and Sweden, the northwestern central Stockholm urban area is considered the club's stronghold.

Black Army – Stockholm was formed in 1981 and is today the biggest supporter group of AIK. During the 1980s and 1990s, Black Army raged havoc around the country, making headlines in national newspapers. As a result of Black Army's bad behaviour another supporter group was created in 2000, Allmänna Supporterklubben (the General Supporters Club), as an option to Black Army. In 2002 Allmänna Supporterklubben was renamed to the much more AIK related name "Smokinglirarna" (roughly, "The Players", literally "the Black Tie Players"). In 2002 an ultras group was formed, Ultras Nord (Ultras North), and two years later, 2004, Sol Invictus was formed. Black Army, Smokinglirarna, Ultras Nord and Sol Invictus together with AIK-Tifo forms the so-called AIK-Alliansen (the AIK Alliance).

In 1907, the Crown Prince of Sweden Gustaf Adolf became patron and first honorary member of the club. This has since been in line with family tradition, and today the King of Sweden Carl XVI Gustaf is patron of the club. From time to time the royal family of Sweden visits the club's home matches. Prince Daniel is a well-known AIK fan even before his marriage to the Crown Princess Victoria.

Notable fans of AIK include songwriter and producer Max Martin; DJ Sebastian Ingrosso; swimmer Sarah Sjöström; former leader of the Swedish Social Democratic Party Mona Sahlin; and Spotify founder Daniel Ek. Former president of UEFA Lennart Johansson was a supporter since childhood. The Wallenberg family are also closely attached with AIK, being one of the major shareholders.

The club's hymn is "Å vi é AIK" (meaning "Oh we are AIK"), a Swedish-lyric cover of the 1971 song "The Last Farewell" by Roger Whittaker.

Rivalries
AIK's main rival is Djurgårdens IF, also formed in 1891 in Stockholm, just three weeks after AIK. AIK also maintains a strong animosity towards the third major Stockholm side Hammarby IF. The club's biggest rival outside the Stockholm urban area is IFK Göteborg, Leksands IF, and Malmö FF.

References

External links
 AIK – official site
 Black Army - Stockholm – AIK's official fan club

 
Sports teams in Sweden
Sports clubs established in 1891
Multi-sport clubs in Sweden
Association football clubs established in 1891
1891 establishments in Sweden
Figure skating clubs in Sweden

ca:AIK Solna
pl:AIK Solna
zh:AIK足球俱乐部